Myopites eximia is a species of tephritid or fruit flies in the genus Myopites of the family Tephritidae.

Distribution
United Kingdom, France.

References

Tephritinae
Insects described in 1932
Diptera of Europe